Yehuda Leon Poliker (born December 25, 1950) is an Israeli singer, songwriter, musician, and painter. Poliker first became known in the 1980s as the lead vocalist for the band Benzene. In 1985, after Benzene broke up, he began a varied solo career that included motifs from rock, pop, and traditional Greek music.

Biography
Yehuda Poliker (birth name: Leonidas Polikaris) was born in Kiryat Haim, a suburb of Haifa, Israel. His parents were Greek Jews and Holocaust survivors who were deported to Auschwitz from Thessaloniki.

Music career

1980s

In 1981, Poliker began his career-long collaboration with writer and producer . Poliker's band, Benzene, released two albums: 24 Sha'ot (24 Hours) and Mishmeret Layla (Night Watch), which included hit singles such as "Hofshi Ze Legamrei Levad" ("Free Is Totally Alone"), "Geshem" ("Rain") and "Yom Shishi" (Friday). After Benzene broke up, Poliker began a solo career. In 1985, he released his first solo album, Einaim Shely (These Eyes of Mine). All of the tracks on the album were well-known Greek songs literally translated into Hebrew. In 1986, Poliker released his second solo album, Kholem Behakitz (Daydreamer). His third album, Efer VeAvak (Dust and Ashes), released in 1988, dealt mostly with the children of Holocaust survivors. It sold more than 70,000 copies, and in 2005, was rated by Ynet as number one of the top 100 best albums ever recorded in Israel.

1990s
In 1990, Poliker released his fourth solo album, Pakhot Aval Ko'ev (Hurts But Less). It sold over 140,000 copies, becoming Poliker's most successful album. Following the success of Pakhot Aval Ko'ev, Poliker  started to work on an instrumental record, released in 1992 as Le'enekha Hakekhulot (For Your Blue Eyes). In 1995, Poliker released a double album, Hayeled Sh'Beha (The Child Within You), featuring the songs "Ani Rotze Gam" ("I Want Too"), "Ma Yihye Yihye" ("What Will Be, Will Be") and "Namess Bageshem" ("Dissolved in the Rain"). The ensuing concert tour was documented on the double live album Hofa'a Khaya Bekaysaria (Live in Caesarea).

2000–present
In 2001, Poliker released the album Eih Korim Laahava Sheli? (What Is My Love Called?). The title song, written by Poliker with Yaakov Gilad, won Song of the Year at the 2002 Golden Feather Awards, administered by ACUM, an Israeli society of composers, authors, and publishers. In 2003, he released his first compilation album, Hameitav (The Best), including songs from both Benzene and his solo career, as well as new tracks. In 2007, he released Hummus Sapiens in collaboration with Greek poet Manolis Rasoulis. 

In 2010, Poliker began his Shirim Shehilkhanti Le'aherim (Songs I Wrote for Others) tour. The tour, which began as a one-time event, featured his first songs for other singers, such as Yossi Banai, Riki Gal, and Arik Einstein. Also in 2010, he released Ahava Al Tnai (Conditional Love). The first single from it, "Shlosha Yamim" ("Three Days"), written by Poliker and Gilad, reached the top of the Israeli charts. In 2011, he released Kol Davar Mazkir Li (Everything Reminds Me), which, like Einaim Sheli, consisted of well-known Greek songs translated into Hebrew. He sang the title track in Greek with Haris Alexiou, and also recorded a Hebrew version. Two weeks after its release, the album was certified gold. 

In summer 2012, Poliker released Jacko and Yehuda Poliker, which contained rare recordings of his parents singing Thessaloniki Jewish songs in Greek and Ladino before World War II.  In spring 2014, he released Muzeon Ha Halomot (The Museum of Dreams), which featured the guitar and the bouzouki. The album was certified gold and was soon followed by a live tour.

Film
Poliker's father, Jacko, told the story of his escape from Auschwitz in the 1988 film Because of That War (Hebrew: B'Glal Hamilhamah Hahi), which featured music by his son. The film included interviews with Yehuda Poliker and Yaakov Gilad, whose parents, Polish Jews, also survived Auschwitz.

Book
In 2019, Poliker's book My Shadow and I was published by Yedioth Books. The book depicts situations and imagery from his childhood and adolescents, from the vantage point of both a child and an adult.

Awards and recognition
In 2012, Poliker won the ACUM Lifetime Achievement Award. In 2014, Poliker received the Gold Cross of the Order of the Phoenix, one of Greece's highest awards for achievement in the arts. The award was presented by the Greek ambassador to Israel, Spyridon Lampridis.

Personal life
He is openly gay.

See also
Music of Israel
Greece-Israel relations

References

External links

A page about Yehuda Poliker 

1950 births
Living people
Gold Crosses of the Order of the Phoenix (Greece)
Israeli guitarists
Jewish Israeli musicians
Jewish Israeli artists
Israeli people of Greek-Jewish descent
Israeli male painters
Israeli pop singers
Israeli gay musicians
Israeli gay artists
Israeli LGBT singers
Israeli LGBT songwriters
Israeli LGBT painters
Musicians from Haifa
Artists from Haifa
20th-century Israeli male singers
21st-century Israeli male singers
20th-century Israeli male artists
21st-century Israeli male artists
20th-century Israeli painters
21st-century Israeli painters
Gay singers
Gay songwriters
Gay painters
Gay Jews
20th-century Israeli LGBT people
21st-century Israeli LGBT people